The Beverly Country Club, located in the American city of Chicago, Illinois, is one of Chicago's historical cornerstones. The club was founded in 1908 and initially designed by George O'Neil, also the club's first professional golfer. Shortly after, well-known golf course architect Tom Bendelow helped fortify the layout. In 1918, the legendary architect Donald Ross created and executed a master plan to renovate the course. In 1919, Eddie Loos was serving as the head professional and paired with Jim Barnes to win a memorable match played against Jock Hutchison and Bob MacDonald.

Since, the Beverly Country Club has been a mainstay in American golfing circles. In 2002, the members of the Beverly Country Club adopted a plan to completely restore and rejuvenate the golf course. Under guidance of golf course architect and restorer Ron Prichard, the course has recaptured the design concepts which Ross himself included in his original work at the Beverly Country Club.

Architectural history
Beverly's mark on American golf was firmly made when club officials decided to ask legendary architect Donald Ross to create a master plan to renovate the course and bring it back to major championship standards.  Over the course of nearly a decade, the entire Ross plan was adopted.  In a fitting touch of déjà vu, a dedicated group of Beverly members recently led the club through a restoration of the golf course that reclaimed many of the Ross features that had been lost over the decades.
 
The genius of Ross's work lies in the routing of the golf course, in which no two consecutive holes run in the same direction, despite the fact that the course is laid out within a perfect rectangle that is hemmed in and bisected by three arterial streets and a railroad line. Ross made excellent use of the dominant geological feature of property: a prominent ridge that runs from behind the fifth green eastward through the promontory above the second fairway.
 
Five holes on the front nine are designed around this ridge, which had been part of the southern shore of prehistoric Lake Chicago, a forgotten body of water that deposited sand dunes along Beverly's back nine.  Students of Ross's design "school" will recognize his mark throughout the course, particularly in the tee and green complexes.
 
Stretching beyond 7,000 yards, Beverly is regularly named by golf publications as one of the nation's best courses, and recently ranked No. 51 on Golfweek's list of the Best Classic Courses in the United States.

Tournament history
Over the years, Beverly has been the host of one U.S. Amateur (1931); one U.S. Senior Amateur (2009); one Western Junior (2011); four Western Opens (1910, 1963, 1967 and 1970); two Western Amateurs (1930, 2014); three Women's Western Opens (1937, 1960 and 1965); and the 1943 Chicago Victory National Open, a wartime substitute for the National Open.

The Beverly Country Club hosted the 2011 Western Golf Association (WGA) Western Junior, making it one of only a handful of clubs that has hosted three original WGA Golf Championships: the Western Open (known now as the BMW Championship), the Western Amateur and the Western Junior.

In 2014, Beverly hosted the Western Amateur for the first time since 1930. The tournament, played July 28 – August 2, was won by Beau Hossler. The tournament also saw Beverly's long-standing course record of 64, broken by Doug Ghim with an 8-under 63, in the second round of stroke play. The course record had stood for 47 years. The Western Amateur will return to Beverly in 2026.

Famous tournament champions
 1910 Western Open won by Chick Evans
 In 1925, Virginia Van Wie captured one of her first championships at Beverly Country Club
 1931 U.S. Amateur won by Francis Ouimet
 1963 Western Open won by Arnold Palmer
 1967 Western Open won by Jack Nicklaus
 1970 Western Open won by Hugh Royer Jr.
 Patty Berg and Babe Zaharias have each held the women's course record which is still held by Susie Maxwell

Caddie tradition
The Beverly Country Club has a long, proud relationship with the Western Golf Association and the Evans Scholars Foundation, a charitable trust which provides full-tuition scholarships renewable for up to four years to deserving caddies.  The program started in 1930 and was originally endowed with the donated golf winnings of Chick Evans, all of whose golf winnings went toward the scholarships as a way of preserving his amateur status. Today the Evans Scholarship Foundation is supported by tens of thousands of contributors across the country, one of the largest of which is the Beverly Country Club. With 356 of the 11,556 Evans Scholars alumni, The Beverly Country Club boasts the record for the largest number of Evans Scholar alumni from any single club in America.

Holes

References

 "Beverly Country Club"
 "Golf Club Atlas"
 "Western Golf Association"

Golf clubs and courses in Chicago
Golf clubs and courses designed by Donald Ross
Sports venues completed in 1908
1908 establishments in Illinois